The Lieblein House is a single-family house located at 525 Quincy Street in Hancock, Michigan.  It has been converted to an office building and is also known as the Hoover Center.   The structure was designated a Michigan State Historic Site in 1979 and listed on the National Register of Historic Places in 1980.

History 
The Lieblein House was built in 1895 by William Washburn, who owned a local Hancock clothing store.  In about 1905, Washburn sold the house to Edward Lieblein, a wholesale grocer who owned stores in Hancock and Calumet.  The house remained in the Lieblein family until 1979, when Edward Lieblein Jr. sold it to Suomi College (now Finlandia University).  The college renamed it the "Vaino & Judith Hoover Center" after the patrons Vaino and Judith Hoover who funded the purchase.  As of 2009, the building houses the offices of the President, Institutional Advancement, Alumni Relations, and Communications.

Description 
The Lieblein House is a rectangular, two-and-a-half-story Queen Anne style house, sitting on a sandstone foundation and covered with rectangular and fishscale shingles.  It has an enclosed wrap-around porch with Doric columns and narrow one-over-one windows.  The narrow windows are also used in a three-story polygonal turret topped with a galvanized metal roof and spire.  The porch and turret gives the facade both horizontal and vertical lines.  A bay window and multiple multi-paned and double-hung windows light the interior.  The roof is gabled on three sides, with leaded glass Palladian windows in the side gables.

References

Houses in Houghton County, Michigan
Houses on the National Register of Historic Places in Michigan
Queen Anne architecture in Michigan
Houses completed in 1895
Michigan State Historic Sites in Houghton County
National Register of Historic Places in Houghton County, Michigan